Number Our Days is a 1976 American short documentary film about a community of elderly Jews in Venice, California. It was directed by Lynne Littman and aired on KCET's news show 28 Tonight. The Academy Film Archive preserved Number Our Days in 2007.

Reception
Lee Margulies of the Los Angeles Times called Number Our Days "beautiful" and "a very human film, full of expressive faces and heartfelt emotion. It is full of compassion but never pity." John J. O'Connor of The New York Times wrote that Number Our Days was "a moving portrait of loneliness, pride, humor, bitterness and dignity".

Number Our Days won an Oscar at the 49th Academy Awards, held in 1977, for Documentary Short Subject.

Cast
 Harry Asimow as Himself (archive footage)
 Barbara Myerhoff as Herself
 Lynne Littman as Herself (voice) (uncredited)
 Eddie Gurnick as band leader

References

External links
Number Our Days at Direct Cinema Limited

Number Our Days at the American Archive of Public Broadcasting

1976 films
1976 documentary films
1976 independent films
1970s short documentary films
American short documentary films
Best Documentary Short Subject Academy Award winners
American independent films
Jews and Judaism in California
Documentary films about old age
Films shot in Venice, Los Angeles
Documentary films about Jews and Judaism in the United States
1970s English-language films
1970s American films